Dubai Public Libraries (مكتبات دبي العامة) is a library system of the Dubai Municipality serving Dubai, United Arab Emirates (UAE).

The system, the oldest in the UAE, began in 1963 when Al Ras Public Library was built in the Al Ras area of Deira, central Dubai. In 1989, four branches opened in Hor Al Anz, Al Rashidiya, Al Safa, and Umm Suqeim. Hatta Library opened in 1998 and Al Twar Public Library opened in the summer of 2007. The Al Twar library cost more than 10 million UAE dirhams.

Libraries
ICDL Center

Libraries in Deira, Dubai
The following are library branches in Deira:

Al Ras Library, Baniyas Road
Hor Al Anz Library, Al Wuheida Road
Rashidiya Library, Al Rashidiya
Al Twar Library, Al Twar
Al Safa Arts & Design Library
Um Suqeim Library
Hatta Library
Al Mankhool Library

See also
 Mohammed Bin Rashid Library

References

External links
 Dubai Public Libraries (English)
 Dubai Public Libraries  (Arabic)

Libraries in Dubai
Culture in Dubai